Nea Skioni is a village and a community in the peninsula of Kassandra, Chalkidiki, Macedonia, Greece.  The population in 2011 was 728 for the village.  Nea Skioni is located 7 km southwest of Chaniotis, 7 km west of Agia Paraskevi and 90 km southeast of Thessaloniki. It is named after the ancient city of Scione, whose site was nearby to the east.

Nea Skioni was established in 1918 where fisherman huts existed. In 1930, the old village “Tsaprani”, which was located in the mountain of Kassandra, was abandoned.

The new village was named after the ancient Skioni, which was the oldest colony. According to Thoukidides it was built after the Trojan War by the Pellineis of Peloponnese, who located there to spend the winter.

The village is a popular tourist destination known for its pleasant and engaging atmosphere.

Population

See also

List of settlements in Chalkidiki

References

External links

Nea Skioni on GTP Travel Pages (in English and Greek)
Nea Skioni
About Nea Skioni Kassandra 

Populated places in Chalkidiki